Paris is a hamlet belonging to the Lemvig Municipality, located in Jutland in Denmark. It has a population of 12 and eight or nine houses. Residents hold a local festival once a year. The hamlet was visited by comedian Jan Gintberg, who made fun of the inhabitants. Another village south of nearby Lemvig is named Rom after Rome.

References

Villages in Denmark
Populated places in Central Denmark Region
Lemvig Municipality